
Gmina Lubień Kujawski is an urban-rural gmina (administrative district) in Włocławek County, Kuyavian-Pomeranian Voivodeship, in north-central Poland.

Villages
Apart from the town of Lubień Kujawski, Gmina Lubień Kujawski contains the villages and settlements of Antoniewo, Bagno, Beszyn, Bileńska Kolonia, Bilno, Błędowo, Błonie, Chojny, Chwalibogowo, Czaple, Dziankówek, Dziankowo, Gliznowo, Gocław, Gole, Golska Huta, Henryków, Kaczawka, Kaliska, Kamienna, Kanibród, Kąty, Kłóbka, Kłóbka-Nowy Młyn, Kłóbka-Podgórze, Kobyla Łąka, Kołomia, Kostulin, Kretkowo, Krzewie, Krzewie Drugie, Modlibórz, Morzyce, Narty, Narty-Piaski, Nowa Wieś, Nowe Czaple, Nowe Gagowy, Rutkowice, Rzegocin, Rzeżewo, Siemiany, Sławęcin, Sławęckie Góry, Stare Gagowy, Stępka, Stróże, Świerna, Szewo, Uchodze, Walentowo, Wąwał, Wiktorowo, Wola Dziankowska, Wola Olszowa, Wola Olszowa-Parcele and Zakrzewo.

Neighbouring gminas
Gmina Lubień Kujawski is bordered by the gminas of Baruchowo, Choceń, Chodecz, Gostynin, Kowal, Łanięta and Nowe Ostrowy.

References
Polish official population figures 2006

Lubien Kujawski
Włocławek County